HMS Daedalus II was a British Royal Navy air station and training establishment between 1940 and 1946.  The name applied to four different locations with the United Kingdom at various times during the Second World War. The establishment was formed to free up space at RNAS Lee-on-Solent (HMS Daedalus).

The first location was former Royal Air Force (RAF) station at Lympne Airport.  This RAF station was taken over by the Fleet Air Arm in July 1939 and commissioned as HMS Buzzard for use as a training establishment for mechanics from HMS Daedalus. It was renamed as HMS Daedalus II in January 1940 but the airfield was transferred back to the RAF in May 1940.  

As the airfield in Kent was being transferred back to the RAF an air-sea rescue seaplane base and aircrew training centre was established at the Royal Motor Yacht Club at Sandbanks in Dorset and this base was formally commissioned as HMS Daedalus II on 15 May 1940. 764 & 765 Naval Air Squadrons (NAS) were based there with their Supermarine Walrus, Fairey Swordfish and Fairey Seafox aircraft. This station was also known as RNAS Sandbanks. Concurrently the training establishment formerly at Lympne was moved to Clayton Hall, Newcastle-under-Lyme as a base to train artificers but also retained the name Daedalus II.  

In 1942 an outstation of the Sandbanks base was opened at RNAS Lawrenny Ferry in Pembrokeshire and 764 NAS was moved there as an operational conversion unit.  764 NAS remained at Lawrenny Ferry until October 1943 when the squadron was disbanded and the base reduced to care and maintenance status.

Sandbanks was also reduced to care and maintenance status in October 1943 and 765 NAS was also disbanded. The base at Sandbanks later became part of the landing craft base .

By Christmas 1943, Clayton Hall was the only remaining site of HMS Daedalus II and continued to train aircraft artificers throughout the war until January 1946 when HMS Daedalus II was decommissioned.

References

Bibliography
 
 

 

Royal Navy bases in England
Royal Navy bases in Wales
Royal Navy shore establishments
Military installations established in 1940
Military installations closed in 1946